Kim Jin-Ryong is a retired South Korean football player.

Club career

Ulsan Hyundai Horang-i 
He started his professional career in Ulsan Hyundai Horang-i in 2005. He played in the Hauzen Cup. He sustained a critical injury and left for K-League 2005. THe team K-League Champions for 2005.

Gyeongnam FC
He contracted with Gyeongnam FC in December 2005. In the middle of 2006 season, an injury sidelined him.  For the 2007 pre-season of 2007, he joined the team's winter training in Brazil. Another critical injury ended his season. In 2008 season, he returned to the pitch and performed well.

Seongnam Ilhwa Chunma
In January 2009, he moved to Seongnam Ilhwa Chunma. He was traded for Kim Dong-hyun, member of South Korea national team. Gyeongnam FC fans complained, and te team blanked his back number for 2009 season. The team were the 2010 AFC Champions League winners.

Gangwon FC
On 4 July 2011, He moved to Gangwon FC.

Pohang Steelers
On 6 January 2012, Kim joined the Pohang Steelers on a season-long loan, including an option to make the switch permanent in 2013.

International career
Internationally, Kim played for the 2004 Summer Olympics qualification as a member of South Korea U-23 and the 2005 East Asian Football Championship as a member of South Korea .

On 31 July 2005, he debuted in a 2005 East Asian Football Championship match against China PR.

Club career statistics

In 2010's Asia record is including 2010 FIFA Club World Cup results.

References

External links
 
 

1982 births
Living people
Association football forwards
South Korean footballers
South Korea international footballers
Ulsan Hyundai FC players
Gyeongnam FC players
Seongnam FC players
Gangwon FC players
Pohang Steelers players
Negeri Sembilan FA players
K League 1 players
K League 2 players
People from Jinju
Expatriate footballers in Malaysia
Sportspeople from South Gyeongsang Province